Que du vent is a studio album released in 2011 by Québécois néo-trad band Les Cowboys Fringants.  It reached number 1 in Quebec music charts during the week of November 14–20, 2011, and peaked at number 60 on the charts in France for the week of November 21–27, 2011.

Track listing
 "Télé" – 3:59
 "Paris-Montréal" – 3:11
 "Marilou s'en fout" – 3:45
 "L'horloge" – 3:58
 "Que du vent" – 2:57
 "Classe moyenne (avec anchois)" – 3:52
 "Comme Joe Dassin" – 4:08
 "Hasbeen" – 4:33
 "Party!" – 2:43
 "Shooters" – 4:38
 "On tient l'coup" – 3:25

Charts

References

2011 albums
Les Cowboys Fringants albums